Qatil Haseenaon Ke Naam is a Pakistani crime fiction drama original web series streaming on ZEE5. It is created and directed by British-Indian director Meenu Gaur and written by Farjad Nabi and Meenu Gaur. The series is produced by Hasan Raza Abidi and Shailja Kejriwal. This six episode web series was released on 10 December 2021. It stars Rubya Chaudhry, Sanam Saeed, Sarwat Gilani, Eman Suleman and Faiza Gillani in the lead roles.

Plot 
Mai Maalki (Samiya Mumtaaz) happens to be one of the series’ several aggrieved ladies who punish men for their deceit, opportunism and violence. Almost all the men here are bad, unless they are not heterosexual or neck-deep in love.

Cast 

 Samiya Mumtaz as Mai Malki
 Sanam Saeed as Zuvi
 Sarwat Gilani as Mehek
 Mehar Bano as Anarkali
 Faiza Gillani as Kanwal
 Beo Raana Zafar as Massey Ma
 Eman Suleman as Zehra
 Rubya Chaudhry as Natasha
 Saleem Mairaj as Najji Shah
 Ahsan Khan as Gulab
 Osman Khalid Butt as Aftab
 Sheheryar Munawar as Bilal
 Kashif Hussian as Amar
 Fawad Khan as Abdullah
 Omar Rahim as Jojji
 Hajra Yamin as Dolla
 Tara Mahmood as Dr. Naheed

Episode list

Release 
ZEE5 and Zindagi announced the launch of a trailer on 18 November 2021 and the series was released on 10 December 2021.

Reception

Critical reviews 

Akhila Damodaran of OTTPlay has given 4/5 stars stating that the web series is a feminist, bold and unconventional Pakistani noir. The series has many surprises. It has bold and heretical as it shows that women are also drinking and smoking, never seen in Pakistani dramas. It is well written and edited. The actors' performances were impressive, and the main highlight was the background score. The web series is a definite watch that has a rare subject dealt in Urdu cinema and dramas and comes with a pleasant surprise.

Roushni Sarkar of Cinestaan has given 2.5/5 start stating that the web series is an aesthetic, audacious depiction of women seeking revenge and serving justice. The well-written series boasts of power-packed performances by the entire cast, though it gains momentum and intensity a little late. Series with a power-pack performance by all the actors, music composer has played well, the climax moment of each story and the jaw-dropping twists reward the viewer's patience.

Archi Sengupta of Leisurebyte says that the stories involving women are usually wild, scary or shocking or it is a mixture of all three. The web series has some great performances. In a femme fatale story, the women actors are absolutely wonderful and great to watch. Set in one neighbourhood, these women form the backbone of the story that keeps everything together. The characters are interesting and their lives’ problems are shocking enough to warrant at least one watch.

References

External links 
 Qatil Haseenaon Ke Naam at ZEE5
 

ZEE5 original programming
Pakistani web series
2021 web series debuts